Barchatus is a genus of toadfish native to the western Indian Ocean, Somalia and the Red Sea.

Species
There are currently 2 recognized species in this genus:
 Barchatus cirrhosus Klunzinger, 1871
 Barchatus indicus D. W. Greenfield, 2014

References

Batrachoididae